Devin Timothy Soane Asiasi (born August 14, 1997) is an American football tight end for the Cincinnati Bengals of the National Football League (NFL). He played college football at UCLA. He was drafted by the New England Patriots in the third round of the 2020 NFL Draft.

High school career
Born in San Mateo, California and raised in the Shoreview community, Asiasi played high school football on both offense and defense at De La Salle High School in Concord, California. During his senior season, he hauled in 17 catches for 311 yards and five touchdowns on offense, and finished with 49 tackles, five pass breakups and four sacks on defense. He participated in the 2016 U.S. Army All-American Bowl.

He was rated as a four-star prospect by ESPN.com, Rivals.com, and Scout.com, and was ranked by ESPN as the No. 3 tight end in college football's incoming Class of 2016 and the No. 44 overall player in the 2016 ESPN 300.

College career

Michigan
Asiasi was personally recruited by Michigan head coach Jim Harbaugh during a visit to De La Salle High School in January 2016. On February 3, 2016, he committed to play college football for the Michigan Wolverines.

On September 24, 2016, Asiasi scored his first college touchdown in a victory over Penn State. He finished the season with two catches for 18 yards and one touchdown.

Following his freshman season, Asiasi transferred to UCLA. He transferred to be closer to his home in San Mateo, California.

UCLA
After sitting out the 2017 season due to transfer rules, Asiasi made his debut for the Bruins in 2018. He finished the season with six receptions for 130 yards and one touchdown.

He saw a much greater role in 2019, playing in 12 games and netting 44 receptions for 641 yards and 4 touchdowns. He had 141 yards against USC, his first 100-yard game.

Statistics

Professional career

New England Patriots
Asiasi was selected in the third round of the 2020 NFL Draft by the New England Patriots with the 91st overall pick. He was placed on injured reserve on November 3, 2020. Asiasi was activated off of injured reserve on December 10. During the Patriots' Week 17 game against the New York Jets on January 3, 2021, Asiasi recorded the first two receptions of his career and his first receiving touchdown during the 28–14 win.

On August 30, 2022, Asiasi was waived by the Patriots.

Cincinnati Bengals
On August 31, 2022, Asiasi was claimed off waivers by the Cincinnati Bengals.

NFL career statistics

Personal life
Asiasi is of Samoan and Tongan descent.

References

External links
 UCLA Bruins bio

1997 births
Living people
American sportspeople of Samoan descent
American people of Tongan descent
People from San Mateo, California
Players of American football from California
Sportspeople from the San Francisco Bay Area
American football tight ends
Michigan Wolverines football players
UCLA Bruins football players
New England Patriots players
De La Salle High School (Concord, California) alumni
Cincinnati Bengals players